The Wurtz–Fittig reaction is the chemical reaction of aryl halides with alkyl halides and sodium metal in the presence of dry ether to give substituted aromatic compounds. Charles Adolphe Wurtz reported what is now known as the Wurtz reaction in 1855, involving the formation of a new carbon-carbon bond by coupling two alkyl halides. Work by Wilhelm Rudolph Fittig in the 1860s extended the approach to the coupling of an alkyl halide with an aryl halide. This modification of the Wurtz reaction is considered a separate process and is named for both scientists.

The reaction works best for forming asymmetrical products if the halide reactants are somehow separate in their relative chemical reactivities. One way to accomplish this is to form the reactants with halogens of different periods. Typically the alkyl halide is made more reactive than the aryl halide, increasing the probability that the alkyl halide will form the organosodium bond first and thus act more effectively as a nucleophile toward the aryl halide.
Typically the reaction is used for the alkylation of aryl halides; however, with the use of ultrasound the reaction can also be made useful for the production of biphenyl compounds.

Mechanism 
There are two approaches to describing the mechanism of the Wurtz–Fittig reaction. The first involves the sodium-mediated formation of both alkyl and aryl radicals. The alkyl and aryl radicals then combine to form a substituted aromatic compound.

The second approach involves the formation of an intermediate organo-alkali compound followed by nucleophilic attack of the alkyl halide.

There is empirical evidence for both approaches. The free radical mechanism is supported by the observation of side products whose formation cannot be explained by an organo-alkali mechanism. In a reaction between sodium and chlorobenzene, Bachmann and Clarke find that one of the many side products is triphenylene. They contend that the only way to explain the formation of triphenylene is through a free radical mechanism.
In this mechanism, two free phenyl radicals react to form benzene and a free phenylene anion. The three phenylene anions then combine via a radical mechanism to form the triphenylene molecule. Bachmann and Clarke consider the occurrence of triphenylene as evidence that the Wurtz–Fittig reaction happens through a radical mechanism.

The organo-alkali mechanism is supported by indirect evidence which shows that an organo-alkali intermediate actually forms during the reaction. This has been observed my many investigators. For example, Shoruguin shows that carbon dioxide bubbling through a mixture of sodium and isobutyl bromide results in the formation of 3-methylbutanoic acid.

The formation of 3-methylbutanoic acid follows from a nucleophilic attack of carbon dioxide by an organosodium compound. These results suggest that Wurtz–Fittig reaction occurs via the formation of an organoalkali compound since the reaction conditions are similar.

Use of other metals 
The Wurtz–Fittig reaction can be conducted using metals other than sodium. Some examples include potassium, iron, copper, and lithium. When lithium is used, the reaction occurs with appreciable yield only under ultrasound. Ultrasound is known to cleave halogen atoms from aryl and alkyl halides through a free-radical mechanism

Applications 
The Wurtz–Fittig reaction has limited applicability, since side reactions such as rearrangements and eliminations are prevalent. However, the reaction is useful for the laboratory synthesis of organosilicon compounds, although there are challenges in adapting the procedure to a large-scale industrial process. Organosilicon compounds successfully synthesized using the Wurtz–Fittig reaction include silylated calixarenes, t-butylsilicon compounds, and vinylsilanes. For example, t-butyltriethoxysilane can be prepared with the Wurtz–Fitting reaction by combining tetraoxysilane, t-butyl chloride and molten sodium. The reaction proceeds with a 40% yield.

See also
 Wurtz reaction

References

Carbon-carbon bond forming reactions
Substitution reactions
Name reactions